The 2021 St. Thomas Tommies football team represented the University of St. Thomas in Saint Paul, Minnesota as a member of the Pioneer Football League (PFL) during the 2021 NCAA Division I FCS football season. Led by 13th-year head coach Glenn Caruso, the Tommies compiled an overall record of 7–3 with a mark of 6–2 in conference play, tying for third place in the PFL. St. Thomas played home games at O'Shaughnessy Stadium in Saint Paul, Minnesota.

This was the St. Thomas's first season competing at the NCAA Division I Football Championship Subdivision (FCS) level after transitioning from NCAA Division III. The 2020 season was initially postponed to the spring of 2021 and then canceled because of the COVID-19 pandemic.

Schedule

References

St. Thomas
St. Thomas (Minnesota) Tommies football seasons
St. Thomas Tommies football